The Young Radicals of the Left (French: Jeunes Radicaux de Gauche abbreviated as JRG), are the youth organisation of the French social-liberal Radical Party of the Left. In opposition to its common understanding of its name, the YRL are a moderate centre-left political party.

The party gathers members under 29 years of age all throughout France.

Organisation 
It is led by its President elected for two years by all members of the party. The President itself appoints six members of the National Board and furthermore, the President also appoints National Officers. Since May 2008, the party organises itself autonomously within the Radical Party of the Left.

National Board 
President: Cindy CHADES
Vice-President: Sofiane IGOUDJIL
Vice-President: Nicolas SAUZEAT
Vice-President: Noémie VERAQUIN
General Secretary: Lucas DUVAL
Deputy General Secretary: Anaïs SALABERT
Treasurer: Axel BOSSY

National Officers 
The Young Radicals of the Left have 12 National Officers.

National Council 
The national council is the sovereign body of the Young Radicals of the Left and gathers the 7 members of the National Board, the 12 National Officers, Regional Delegates and members who are representing the YRL in various institutions.

Former presidents 
Jean-Francois AUDUC (1973), Jean-Pierre MATTEI (1976-1977), Jean-Maurice DUVAL (1977-1978), Daniel SEJOURNE (1980-1981), Bruno MARTIN (1981-1984), Daniel GUERIN (1984-1986), Jean-Marc AMBROSINI (1986-1987), Thierry BRAILLARD (1987-1991), Julien DUQUENNE (2002-2005), Olivier MAILLEBUAU (2005-2010), Sandra-Elise REVIRIEGO (2010-2012), Selim-Alexandre ARRAD-BAUDEAN (2012-2014), Géraldine GUILPAIN (2014-2016), Yanis MALLION (2016-2019), unknown (2019-2021)

Policies 
The YRL advocate republicanism, insisting on laïcité (secularism), and positioning them against the idea of affirmative action as advocating equality of treatment between all citizens.
The YRL also defend the idea of individual and civil liberties and the concept of progressivism supporting gay marriage, right to abort and euthanasia.
The Young Radicals of the Left desire a 6th Republic with more transparent and democratic institutions.
The YRL support the idea of a Federal Europe and support also the accession of Turkey to the European Union.
The Young Radicals of the Left wishes to apply the concept of Laïcité over the whole territory of France (nowaday, in Alsace and Moselle, secularism between the Church and the State is still not implemented). They asked for introducing the notion of secularism in the IFLRY Manifesto in Istanbul in 2011; their motion was accepted.

International affiliations 
The YRL are full members of the International Federation of Liberal Youth (IFLRY) and associate members of the LYMEC since 2013. A member of the YRL was elected President of the LYMEC in 1994.

International Officers 
 Since 2014 : Yanis Malion (Vice-President in charge of external relationships)
 2012-2014 : Olympio Kyprianou
 2010-2012 : Nasha Gagnebin
 2008-2010 : Romain Rocher
 2008 : Sandra-Elise Reviriego
 2006-2008 : Michel Lejeune-Mengwang 
 2006 : Caroline Gillet

See also 
 Radical Party of the Left

References

External links
Young Radicals of the Left's Manifesto (in English)
Young Radicals of the Left (in French)
Radical Party of the Left website (in French)
New staff members - Sept 2014 (in French)
Youth wings of political parties in France